Acleris ferox is a species of moth of the family Tortricidae. It is found in China (Yunnan).

References

Moths described in 1975
ferox
Moths of Asia